Chief Alaba Lawson (born Alaba Oluwaseun Lawson on January 18, 1951) is a Nigerian business magnate, entrepreneur and academician. She currently serves as the first female president of NACCIMA and chairman of the board of the Governing Council, Moshood Abiola Polytechnic, Ogun State.

Chief Lawson is also the president pro-tempore of the Forum of Female Traditional Rulers in Nigeria.

Early life and education
Born into the Jibolu-Taiwo family of Abeokuta, the capital of Ogun State, she completed her primary and secondary school education at St. James’ African Primary School, Idi-Ape, Abeokuta between 1957 and 1962 and Abeokuta Girls Grammar School, Abeokuta, leaving in 1968 before she proceeded to St. Nicholas Montessori Teachers’ Training College at Prince's Gate, England in 1973 where she obtained a 1st Class Diploma in Education.

Career
She started her teaching career in 1969 at Children House School, Ibara and while at England, she taught at Queen's Gate Montessori Nursery School and Mill Hill Nursery and Junior School before she later came back to Nigeria in 1977 to establish her own school called Lawson's Childcare Nursery and Primary School where she started with just three students and has now grown to be Lawson Group of Schools.

She later established a trading/distributing firm known as Capricorn Stores Ltd, between 1968 and 1996.  where she had distributing outlets with Nigerian Breweries Ltd, Nigerian Bottling Company Ltd, Guinness Nigeria Ltd, West African Portland Cement Ltd etc. 
She became the President of the Abeokuta Chambers of Commerce in 1995 and later became the President of Ogun Council of Chambers of Commerce in year 2000 and headed it till 2002. And in 2009 she established a Microfinance Bank known as Abestone Microfinance Bank to boost SMES.

On May 25, 2017, Alaba became the first woman to be elected President of National Association Of Chambers of Commerce, Industry, Mines And Agriculture (NACCIMA) following the expiration of the tenure of Dr. Benny Edem

Chieftaincy Titles
The Otun of Oko
The Asiwaju Iyalode of Egbaland
The Otun Iyalode of the Egba Christians
The Iyalode of Egbaland (since deposed)
The Iyalode of Yorubaland

See also
 Abiola Dosunmu

References

External links

1951 births
Living people
Nigerian business executives
Nigerian women educators
Businesspeople from Abeokuta
Nigerian women writers
20th-century Nigerian businesswomen
20th-century Nigerian businesspeople
21st-century Nigerian businesswomen
21st-century Nigerian businesspeople
Yoruba women in business
People from Abeokuta
Yoruba businesspeople
Nigerian Africanists
Yoruba women educators
Nigerian schoolteachers
Founders of Nigerian schools and colleges
20th-century Nigerian educators
Moshood Abiola Polytechnic people
20th-century women educators